Kim Jacob Pizarro (born 5 August 1996) is a Chilean field hockey player.

Jacob first represented Chile in the national senior team in 2014, in a test series against Japan. Jacob went on to also represent the Chilean junior team at the 2016 Junior Pan American Cup and the 2016 Junior World Cup.

Jacob was part of the Chile team at the 2017 Pan American Cup. At the tournament, Chile recorded a historic 4–3 victory over the United States.

References

1995 births
Living people
Chilean female field hockey players
South American Games gold medalists for Chile
South American Games bronze medalists for Chile
South American Games medalists in field hockey
Competitors at the 2018 South American Games
Competitors at the 2022 South American Games
Pan American Games competitors for Chile
Field hockey players at the 2019 Pan American Games
20th-century Chilean women
21st-century Chilean women